translatewiki.net, formerly named Betawiki, is a web-based translation platform powered by the Translate extension for MediaWiki. It can be used to translate various kinds of texts but is commonly used for creating localisations for software interfaces.

It has about 15,000 translators and over 100,000 messages to translate from over 50 projects including MediaWiki, OpenStreetMap, Mifos, Encyclopedia of Life and MantisBT.

Features 

Translatewiki.net is a wiki and so has a relatively low barrier to entry.

Translations are synchronised between a version control system and translatable wiki pages.

For MediaWiki on Wikimedia Foundation projects, new localisations may reach live sites within a day.

The translation editor provides various features for machine-assisted translation, such as
message documentation, also known as "context",
suggestions from a text corpus and machine translation,
checking translations for common syntax mistakes,
translation status of messages.

Translatewiki.net is also a Semantic MediaWiki, part of the semantic web.

History 

Translatewiki.net was made available by Niklas Laxström as localisation platform for all languages of MediaWiki around June 2006.

Besides translation, it was developed with the characteristics of an integrated development environment for MediaWiki (Nukawiki in 2005), with a focus on improvement of internationalisation features.

At the end of 2007 Siebrand Mazeland joined the management of the website, which was moved to the current domain .

In April 2008, it already supported over 100 languages for MediaWiki and 200 of its extensions, "making it one of the most translated software projects ever", as well as FreeCol. Since then, while being an independent volunteer project, it has been recognised as a major player in the global success of MediaWiki and the Wikimedia projects powered by it, like Wikipedia, in over 280 languages.

In 2009 it was improved by a Google Summer of Code project by Niklas Laxström.
In 2011 proofreading features were introduced.
In 2012, its translation memory engine expanded to all Wikimedia projects using Translate.

In 2013, the Translate platform underwent a major revamp through the "Translate User eXperience" project, or "TUX", including "changes in navigation, editor look and feel, translation area, filters, search, and color & style".

Supported formats 

Some of the natively supported formats follow. More can be added with some customisation.

 MediaWiki interface and pages
 GNU Gettext
 Java properties
 Android string resources
 INI
 Dtd
 PHP files
 JavaScript
 JSON
 PythonSingle
 YAML
 XLIFF (partial, in beta)
 AMD i18n bundle

Notable uses 

 MediaWiki and MediaWiki extensions
 FreeCol
 OpenStreetMap
 Encyclopedia of Life
 MantisBT
 FUDforum
 Wikipedia mobile apps
 pywikibot
 Etherpad
 Kiwix
 Gentoo Linux documentation
 KDE documentation
 Kiwix website
 Joomla documentation
 Pandora documentation
 Simple Machines Forum documentation

References

External links 

 
 MediaWiki Translate extension page and documentation
 MediaWiki translatewiki.net
 

multilingual websites
software-localization tools
translation databases
semantic wikis
MediaWiki websites
MediaWiki
free software programmed in PHP
articles containing video clips